The parahippocampal gyrus (or hippocampal gyrus) is a grey matter cortical region of the brain that surrounds the hippocampus and is part of the limbic system. The region plays an important role in memory encoding and retrieval. It has been involved in some cases of hippocampal sclerosis. Asymmetry has been observed in schizophrenia.

Structure
The anterior part of the gyrus includes the perirhinal and entorhinal cortices.

The term parahippocampal cortex is used to refer to an area that encompasses both the posterior parahippocampal gyrus and the medial portion of the fusiform gyrus.

Function

Scene recognition
The parahippocampal place area (PPA) is a sub-region of the parahippocampal cortex that lies medially in the inferior temporo-occipital cortex. PPA plays an important role in the encoding and recognition of environmental scenes (rather than faces).  fMRI studies indicate that this region of the brain becomes highly active when human subjects view topographical scene stimuli such as images of landscapes, cityscapes, or rooms  (i.e. images of "places"). Furthermore, according to work by Pierre Mégevand et al. in 2014, stimulation of the region via intracranial electrodes yields intense topographical visual hallucinations of places and situations. The region was first described by Russell Epstein and Nancy Kanwisher in 1998 at MIT, see also other similar reports by Geoffrey Aguirre and Alumit Ishai.

Damage to the PPA (for example, due to stroke) often leads to a syndrome in which patients cannot visually recognize scenes even though they can recognize the individual objects in the scenes (such as people, furniture, etc.).  The PPA is often considered the complement of the fusiform face area (FFA), a nearby cortical region that responds strongly whenever faces are viewed, and that is believed to be important for face recognition.

Social context
Additional research has suggested that the right parahippocampal gyrus in particular has functions beyond the contextualizing of visual background. Tests by a California-based group led by Katherine P. Rankin indicate that the lobe may play a crucial role in identifying social context as well, including paralinguistic elements of verbal communication. For example, Rankin's research suggests that the right parahippocampal gyrus enables people to detect sarcasm.

Additional images

References

External links

 
 https://web.archive.org/web/20090505072544/http://www2.umdnj.edu/~neuro/studyaid/Practical2000/Q35.htm
 Temporal-lobe.com An interactive diagram of the rat parahippocampal-hippocampal region

Hippocampus (brain)
Gyri